Sulpicia may refer to:

People
Sulpicia (wife of Quintus Fulvius Flaccus), judged the most virtuous of all the Roman matrons.
Sulpicia, Augustan poet
Sulpicia (satirist), poet active during the reign of Domitian
Sulpicia (wife of Lentulus Cruscellio)
Sulpicia Cesis (born 1577), Italian composer and lutenist
Sulpicia Dryantilla, wife of Regalianus, a Roman usurper against Gallienus
Sulpicia Lepidina, wife of Flavius Cerialis

Other
Sulpicia (gens), ancient patrician family of Rome
Ala Sulpicia, a cavalry unit in the Roman army

Sulpicii
Ancient Roman prosopographical lists of women